The Scout and Guide movement in the United Arab Emirates is served by
 Girl Guides Association of the United Arab Emirates, member of the World Association of Girl Guides and Girl Scouts
 Emirates Scout Association, member of the World Organization of the Scout Movement

International Scouting units in the United Arab Emirates
In addition, there are American Boy Scouts in Dubai, linked to the Direct Service branch of the Boy Scouts of America, which supports units around the world, as well as British Scouts.

See also